Paul Schuyler Phillips (born April 28, 1956) is an American conductor, composer and music scholar. He is the Gretchen B. Kimball Director of Orchestral Studies, with the rank of Associate Professor in Teaching, at Stanford University, where he directs the Stanford Symphony Orchestra and Stanford Philharmonia. He is also Music Director and Conductor of the Pioneer Valley Symphony and Chorus, and maintains an international career as a guest conductor and composer. As a scholar, he is best known for his works on Igor Stravinsky and Anthony Burgess.

Conducting
In 1982, Phillips accepted Michael Gielen’s invitation to become his conducting assistant at the Frankfurt Opera, and was appointed 1st Kapellmeister and Chorus Director at Stadttheater Lüneburg the following year. Upon winning 1st Prize in the NOS International Conductors Course in the Netherlands (1983) and selection as a Finalist in the Exxon/Arts Endowment Conductors Program (1984), he left Germany and returned to the US as Associate Conductor of the Greensboro Symphony, Music Director of the Greensboro Symphony Youth Orchestra, and Assistant Conductor of the Greensboro Opera. In 1985, he began a 14-year affiliation with the Maryland Symphony Orchestra as Youth Concert Conductor, conducting the annual MSO Citibank Youth Concerts from 1986-1999. In 1986 he was appointed Associate Conductor of the Savannah Symphony, adding the post of Director of the Savannah Symphony Chorale in 1987.  In 1989, he assumed his position as Director of Orchestras and Chamber Music at Brown University concurrent with an appointment as Associate Conductor of the Rhode Island Philharmonic, and in 1994 was named Music Director and Conductor of the Pioneer Valley Symphony & Chorus. During his tenure with that organization, he has led it to new artistic heights and recognition as one of the leading arts institutions in western Massachusetts.

Acclaimed as a conductor “who was born to stand on a podium,” Phillips has appeared with more than 50 orchestras worldwide, including the Detroit Symphony, San Francisco Symphony, Rochester Philharmonic, Louisville Orchestra, Charlotte Symphony, Columbus Symphony, Netherlands Radio Chamber Orchestra and Iceland Symphony Orchestra, with which he recorded two compact disks. He has also conducted Regional and All-State Orchestras in Maine, Massachusetts, New Hampshire, New Jersey, Oklahoma, Rhode Island and Vermont.

With a repertoire of over 900 works performed in concert, Phillips has conducted much of the standard orchestral repertoire as well as many operas, musical theatre works and ballets. These include productions of Candide, Carmen, Die Fledermaus, Don Pasquale, Madama Butterfly, The Magic Flute, The Medium, Merrily We Roll Along, The Nutcracker, The Pirates of Penzance, Sweeney Todd and Tosca with such companies as the Boston Academy of Music, Commonwealth Opera, Ocean State Lyric Opera, Opera Providence, Connecticut Concert Ballet, Festival Ballet of Rhode Island and the Wisconsin Dance Ensemble. He has also guest conducted numerous choirs, including the Providence Singers, Hampshire Choral Society and Boston's Masterworks Chorale.

Phillips's conducting honors include 1st Prize in the Wiener Meisterkurse Conductors Course and eight ASCAP Awards for Adventurous Programming of Contemporary Music, including 1st prize with the Brown University Orchestra in 2005 in the Collegiate Orchestra Division. He has conducted dozens of regional and world premieres, and hosted numerous composers-in-residence at Brown and with the Pioneer Valley Symphony, including Steve Reich, Steven Stucky, Joseph Schwantner, Samuel Adler, Lukas Foss, David Amram, William P. Perry, Michael Torke, Peter Boyer, George Walker and Gwyneth Walker. He has conducted concerts with Itzhak Perlman, Sergiu Luca, Christopher O'Riley, Matt Haimovitz, Carol Wincenc, Eugenia Zukerman and other noted soloists, as well as with Dave Brubeck, Dizzy Gillespie, Tony Bennett, Ray Charles, Dionne Warwick, Glen Campbell, Ferrante & Teicher, and other jazz and pop stars.

In December 2006/January 2007, he led the Brown University Orchestra on a New Year's concert tour of China that included performances in Beijing's Poly Theatre, at the Shanghai Oriental Art Center, and in Ningbo, Dalian, Suzhou and Changzhou. He premiered Elaine Bearer's "Seaselves" in 1994 composed on a poem by Lawrence Ferlinghetti performed by the Brown University Orchestra with poetry read by Salty Brine. Combined with other new pieces that Phillips conducted that year, this performance led to an ASCAP award for adventurous programming.

Composition

Concert works
Battle-Pieces (Melville) [B & piano; also B & orchestra], 2011
War Music Suite (Logue) [STB soli & orchestra], 2009
A/B: A 90th Birthday Celebration of Anthony Burgess (Phillips) [actor & chamber ensemble], 2007
Invocation (Rumi) [S, fl, pf], 2004
Black Notes and White [brass, perc, org], 2001
Three Burgess Lyrics (Burgess) [SATB chorus, vln, pf], 1999
Celestial Harmonies [ballet for string orch], 1997
Brownian Motion [orch], 1995
Come On Out and Play (Harley) [singer-narrator & orch], 1996 (based on a story by singer/songwriter Bill Harley)
Miracle Songs (various) [S & piano], 1987
Wave [orch], 2014

Stage works
War Music (Christopher Logue), 2005, rev. 2006
 90-minute music theatre piece based on Logue's adaptation of The Iliad. Commissioned by the RI-based performance ensemble Aurea; premiered September 2005 at the FirstWorksProv Festival in Providence, Rhode Island; revived 2006 at the Chicago Humanities Festival and 2007 at the New York Festival of the Humanities.
Mann ist Mann (Brecht), 1984
Dorothees Abenteuer im Lande des Zauberers von Ooz [Dorothy's Adventures in the Land of the Wizard of Oz] (Baum), 1983
Pericles (Shakespeare), 1978

Opera
Weedpatch 2018
 Libretto by Bill Harley. Commissioned by North Cambridge Family Opera.

Music scholarship
Phillips is the author of A Clockwork Counterpoint: The Music and Literature of Anthony Burgess (Manchester University Press, 2010), the first comprehensive study of Burgess's music and its relationship to his writings. He contributed the Anthony Burgess entry in The New Grove Dictionary of Music and Musicians, several articles published in the Anthony Burgess Newsletter, the essay "The postmodernist always swings nice" in Anthony Burgess and Modernity (Manchester University Press, 2008), and the essay "That Man and Music: Ten Reasons Why Anthony Burgess’s Music Matters" in Anthony Burgess: Music in Literature and Literature in Music (Cambridge Scholars Press, 2009). His essay "Burgess and Music" will appear in the new Norton Critical Edition of A Clockwork Orange (Norton, 2010).

In his book Stravinsky and the Russian Traditions, Richard Taruskin cites Phillips's article "The Enigma of Variations: A Study of Igor Stravinsky's Final Work for Orchestra" (Music Analysis, 1984) as "the best exposition in print of Stravinsky's serial methods."

Education
Phillips, a graduate of Cranford High School in New Jersey, attended the Eastman School of Music before transferring to Columbia University, where he received a BA cum laude in music and MA in music composition.  Subsequently, he received a MM in orchestral conducting from the University of Cincinnati College-Conservatory of Music, where he studied with Gerhard Samuel. He completed additional studies at Tanglewood, Aspen Music Festival and School, Music Academy of the West, the Los Angeles Philharmonic Institute,  Mozarteum in Salzburg, and other music academies, studying with Leonard Bernstein, Leonard Slatkin, Kurt Masur, Seiji Ozawa, Michael Tilson Thomas, Otmar Suitner and other conductors. His composition and orchestration teachers include Karel Husa, Warren Benson, Samuel Adler, Fred Lerdahl, George Edwards, and Allen Sapp. He studied piano with Niels Østbye, Kyriena Siloti and Jeanne-Marie Darré, among others.

Film and television
In the 1994 motion picture True Lies, Phillips briefly appears in the opening scene, which was filmed in Newport, RI. Arnold Schwarzenegger, portraying the spy Harry Tasker, crashes an exclusive private party, crosses the main ballroom, and turns into a library where he hands Phillips, bearded and wearing a tuxedo adorned by a white silk scarf around his neck, his glass of champagne before heading upstairs.

In 1999, Phillips was featured as a performer and commentator on Anthony Burgess's music in the BBC television documentary The Burgess Variations written and narrated by Kevin Jackson and produced and directed by David Thompson.

References

External links
"Faculty: Paul Phillips", Stanford Profile
https://web.archive.org/web/20130718145028/https://brown.edu/Departments/Music/sites/orchestra/director.php 
https://web.archive.org/web/20090226131959/http://www.pvso.org/index.html 
http://www.albekduo.com 

1956 births
Aspen Music Festival and School alumni
Brown University faculty
American male conductors (music)
20th-century classical composers
21st-century classical composers
Columbia University School of the Arts alumni
University of Cincinnati – College-Conservatory of Music alumni
University of Cincinnati alumni
Eastman School of Music alumni
Musicians from Newark, New Jersey
Pupils of Samuel Adler (composer)
Living people
21st-century American composers
Male classical composers
20th-century American composers
Classical musicians from New York (state)
Classical musicians from New Jersey
20th-century American conductors (music)
21st-century American conductors (music)
20th-century American male musicians
21st-century American male musicians